Arthur Nugent (30 May 1926 – 6 October 1995) was a Scottish footballer who played as a full back in the Scottish League for Albion Rovers, in the English Football League for Darlington, in Scottish Junior football for Arthurlie, and in English non-league football for Canterbury City and Poole Town.

References

1926 births
1995 deaths
Footballers from Glasgow
Scottish footballers
Association football fullbacks
Arthurlie F.C. players
Albion Rovers F.C. players
Canterbury City F.C. players
Darlington F.C. players
Poole Town F.C. players
Scottish Junior Football Association players
Scottish Football League players
English Football League players